No Script with Marshawn Lynch is an American comedy reality show series that premiered on October 12, 2017 on Facebook Watch. It follows football player Marshawn Lynch as he finds himself in various comedic situations and is joined by an array of guest stars.

Premise
No Script with Marshawn Lynch is an unscripted series that "captures Marshawn in random situations, like whipping figure eights in race cars with Lil Rel Howery from Get Out, to whipping a military tank... for real." Three of the episodes included UNLV physics professor Michael Pravica (a.k.a. "Scientist!") who discussed the underlying physics with Marshawn when (e.g.) drifting cars in Episode 1, indoor skydiving in Episode 4 and demonstrating liquid nitrogen (including explosions) in Episode 8.

Production

Development
On September 12, 2017, it was announced that Facebook Watch had given the production a series order for a first season consisting of eight episodes. It was reported that the series was being produced by Bleacher Report and that Facebook was spending "millions of dollars" for the reality show. In the deal that Facebook reached with the company, Facebook will retain exclusive rights to the show for an undisclosed period-of-time and once that exclusivity window closes, Bleacher Report will own the content and can use it.

Marketing
On October 9, 2017, Facebook released the official trailer for the series.

Episodes

See also
 List of original programs distributed by Facebook Watch
 https://www.highereddive.com/news/marshawn-lynchs-scientist-talks-future-of-research-and-importance-of-str/514031/

References

External links
 

Facebook Watch original programming
2010s American reality television series
2017 American television series debuts
2017 American television series endings
English-language television shows
American comedy web series